"Faller" is a song recorded by Finnish singer Krista Siegfrids. The song was released as a digital download in Finland on 28 February 2016. The song peaked at number 96 on the Swedeish Singles Chart. The song took part in Melodifestivalen 2016, and placed fifth in the second semi-final. The song was written by Krista Siegfrids, Gabriel Alares, Magnus Wallin and Gustaf Svenungsson.

Track listing

Charts

Release history

References

2016 singles
2015 songs
Krista Siegfrids songs
Swedish-language songs
Melodifestivalen songs of 2016
Songs written by Gabriel Alares
Songs written by Krista Siegfrids